Natranaerobius trueperi is a thermotolerant, obligately alkaliphilic, anaerobic and extremely halophilic bacterium from the genus of Natranaerobius which has been isolated from sediments from the Lake UmRisha in Egypt.

References

Bacteria described in 2009
Natranaerobiales